The Remelanini are a small tribe of butterflies in the family Lycaenidae.

Genera

As not all Theclinae have been assigned to tribes, the following list of genera is preliminary:

 Ancema
 Pseudotajuria
 Remelana

 
Taxa named by John Nevill Eliot
Butterfly tribes